Nermin Abadan Unat (born 18 September 1921) is a Turkish academician, lawyer, sociologist, writer, and a professor at Boğaziçi University. She studies Turkish immigration as well as women's rights in Turkey. From 1978 to 1980, she was a member of the (now abolished) Senate of Turkey.

She was one of the leading faces in the development of communications management in Turkey. She introduced the word ''Kamuoyu'' to the Turkish language as a translation for the term public opinion. Similarly, she was the first person to use the term ''Halkla Münasebetler'' in literary works as a translation for the term public relations.

Education and career 
Unat went to İzmir Girls' High School when she was younger, after which she graduated from the Istanbul University Faculty of Law. She continued to work for a magazine named Ulus from 1944 to 1950 following her graduation. She managed to receive a scholarship to attend the University of Minnesota, where she graduated in 1953.

After completing her education, she went on to work as an assistant in Ankara University Faculty of Political Sciences. She became an associate professor five years later, and a full professor in 1966. Unat, who founded the "Political Behavior Institute" in the same faculty, worked in many places abroad. She mainly dealt with issues of immigrant Turkish workers and women's issues abroad. Her book, Woman in Turkish Society, was also published in German and English.

She served as the Vice President of the International Political Science Association (IPSA), the President of the Turkish Social Sciences Association, and since 1978, the Vice President of the Council of Europe's Gender Equality Commission. Between 1978 and 1980, she entered the Turkish parliament as a quota senator for the political party CHP.

She was awarded the Vehbi Koç Award in 2012 for the value she added to the field of education.

Recent endeavors 
Nermin Abadan Unat currently teaches at Boğaziçi University and Istanbul University's Women Research Center. She received a medal of merit from the President of Germany. Her books and articles on Turkish workers abroad have been translated in German, English and French.

Publications 
Migration and Development (Nuffic/SBF, Ankara, 1975)

Women in the Developing World: Evidence from Turkey,(Denver U., 1986)
Migration without end.... From Guestworker to Transnational Citizen (Bilgi Univ:Istanbul, 2002)

See also
 Women in Turkish politics

References

1921 births
Living people
Austrian people of German descent
Austrian people of Turkish descent
Austrian sociologists
Turkish centenarians
Turkish sociologists
20th-century Turkish lawyers
Women centenarians
Commanders Crosses of the Order of Merit of the Federal Republic of Germany
Istanbul University Faculty of Law alumni
Austrian emigrants to Turkey
Turkish expatriates in the United States